Seán Doherty may refer to:

Sean Doherty (biathlete) (born 1995), American biathlete
Seán Doherty (composer) (born 1987), Irish composer, musicologist and singer
Sean Doherty (ethicist) (born 1980), British Anglican priest, academic and ethicist
Sean Doherty (footballer) (born 1985), English football player
Seán Doherty (Gaelic footballer) (born 1947), former Gaelic football manager and player for Dublin
Seán Doherty (Mayo politician) (died 1985), Irish Fianna Fáil politician from Mayo
Seán Doherty (Roscommon politician) (1944–2005), Irish Fianna Fáil politician, TD and senator from Roscommon

See also
Shaun Doherty (born 1964), Irish radio presenter